Mikhail Nikolayevich Semyonov (born 3 April 1969) is a Russian professional football coach and a former player. He is assistant coach with FC Baltika Kaliningrad.

Playing career
As a player, he made his debut in the Soviet First League in 1986 for FC SKA Khabarovsk.

Honours
 Russian Professional Football League Zone East Best Manager: 2015–16.

References

1969 births
Living people
Soviet footballers
Russian footballers
Association football defenders
Russian football managers
FC SKA-Khabarovsk players
FC Kuban Krasnodar managers
FC Novokuznetsk players
FC Smena Komsomolsk-na-Amure players